St Mawgan Monastery was a monastery at St Mawgan in Cornwall, UK, originally of Celtic monks and after the Norman Conquest of Cluniac monks.

History
A Celtic monastery was established in the 6th century. It was dissolved in the 11th century. The monastery became the Manor of Lanherne by 1086 as recorded in the Domesday Book. It then became a manor house for the Arundell family and by 1360 it was their main residence.

In 1794 the estate was given for use as a convent for English Carmelite nuns from Antwerp. The entrance to the convent is Elizabethan. The house had been empty for some time, and had been used by smugglers to store goods. The convent was dedicated to St Joseph and St Anne. It houses a relic of the skull of the martyr Cuthbert Mayne. In the Summer of 2001 the nuns of the Carmel of Lanherne relocated to amalgamate with the Carmel of St Helen in Eccleston. In 2015 the St Helens Carmel closed because of the “age and ill health” of the community and the shortage of vocations. The members of the community dispersed to other monasteries.

The enclosed Franciscan Sisters of the Immaculate took up occupancy in 2001. As of 2010, the Franciscan Sisters of the Immaculate at Lanherne Convent were still at the site.

References 

Monasteries in Cornwall
Cluniac monasteries in England